

Mackena Bell (born June 9, 1990) is an American professional stock car racing driver. She drove the No. 23 Rick Ware Racing Chevrolet for one race in the NASCAR Nationwide Series in 2014. She was also a graduate of NASCAR Drive for Diversity.

Racing career

Early years
Bell started racing go-karts at age five, moved up to Legend cars at age fourteen, and started racing late models at eighteen.

K&N Pro Series East
As part of the Drive for Diversity program in NASCAR, Bell competed in six races in 2010, failing to finish four and recording a best finish of eighteenth, at Martinsville Speedway. In 2013, running the whole season for Max Siegel, she recorded two top-five finishes and failed to finish only two of the fourteen races. In 2014, she crashed out of two races and recorded only one top ten finish. She did not return to the series in 2015.

Nationwide Series
Bell made her only Nationwide Series start at the end of 2014 at Phoenix International Raceway. Driving for Rick Ware Racing, she started 39th and finished 29th, eight laps down.

Personal life
Bell attended Carson High School, where she was the prom queen.

Motorsports career results

NASCAR
(key) (Bold – Pole position awarded by qualifying time. Italics – Pole position earned by points standings or practice time. * – Most laps led.)

Nationwide Series

K&N Pro Series East

References

External links
 

1990 births
Living people
People from Carson City, Nevada
American female racing drivers
Racing drivers from Nevada
NASCAR drivers
21st-century American women